St Mary's Catholic School is a Roman Catholic secondary school and sixth form located in Bishop's Stortford, Hertfordshire, England.

History
In 1896, four nuns from the Congregation of St Mary of Namur came from Belgium to Bishop's Stortford and established a school with nine students. These sisters were the first to provide Catholic education for the district, and the school grew. As it was a fee-paying school, a free smaller school was set up in what is now St Mary's music block. The school, St Joseph's Primary School, grew until, in 1914, it was teaching 57 pupils with only 3 teachers. As St Mary's accumulated more pupils it bought surrounding buildings and land until it had enough classrooms to teach all of their pupils.

As of 2019 there has been a number of new builds and renovations within the site with new football courts, classrooms and renovated facilities. The school now has language and performing arts status with acting, singing, dancing and language classes offered. It also has around 50 classrooms with multiple ICT suites, a 10,000 book library, large sports hall and canteen.

Previously a voluntary aided school administered by Hertfordshire County Council, in September 2021, St Mary's converted to the academy status. The school is now sponsored by the St Francis of Assisi Catholic Academy Trust. It continues to be a Catholic school under the jurisdiction of the Roman Catholic Diocese of Westminster.

Present day
There are approximately 1000 students with the majority coming from outside Bishop's Stortford.

Notable alumni
 Sophie Austin, actress
 Sam Smith, singer-songwriter

References

External links
St Mary's Catholic School official website
St Mary's Catholic School's Twitter account

Secondary schools in Hertfordshire
Catholic secondary schools in the Archdiocese of Westminster
Educational institutions established in 1896
1896 establishments in England
Academies in Hertfordshire
Bishop's Stortford